The 2014 New York Mets season, was the 53rd season of the franchise. It was also their 6th season at Citi Field. The Mets finished 79–83, their most wins since the 2010 season. Also, the Mets finished tied for 2nd place in the National League East, their highest place in the standings since 2008.

Offseason
On November 22, 2013, the Mets signed Chris Young to a one-year $7.25 million deal.

The Mets agreed to terms with free agent outfielder Curtis Granderson on a four-year contract worth $60 million on December 6, 2013.

The Mets signed Bartolo Colón on December 11, 2013 to bolster their starting rotation with the expected season long absence of ace starter Matt Harvey due to Tommy John surgery in October.  Colón signed for $20 million over two years.

The Mets opened up the regular season on March 31 at home against the Washington Nationals.

Season standings

National League East

National League Wild Card

Record vs. opponents

Regular season

Detailed record

Most runs scored in a game: 14 (9/7 vs. CIN)
Most runs allowed in a game: 14 (4/13 vs. LAA)
Most hits in a game: 18 (7/8 vs. ATL)
Longest winning streak: 4 games (7/6–7/9; 7/11–7/18)
Longest losing streak: 6 games (6/3–6/8)

Game log

|-  style="text-align:center; background:#ffbbbb"
| 1 || March 31 || Nationals || 7–9 (10) || Aaron Barrett (1–0) || Jeurys Familia (0–1) ||  || Citi Field (42,442) || 0–1
|-  style="text-align:center; background:#ffbbbb"
| 2 || April 2 || Nationals || 1–5 || Gio González (1–0) || Bartolo Colón (0–1) ||  || Citi Field (29,146) || 0–2
|-  style="text-align:center; background:#ffbbbb"
| 3 || April 3 || Nationals || 2–8 || Tanner Roark (1-0) || Zack Wheeler (0-1) ||  || Citi Field (20,561) || 0–3
|-  style="text-align:center; background:#bbffbb"
| 4 || April 4 || Reds || 4–3 || Jenrry Mejía (1–0) || Mike Leake (0–1) || José Valverde (1) || Citi Field (35,845) || 1–3
|-  style="text-align:center; background:#bbffbb"
| 5 || April 5 || Reds || 6–3 || Carlos Torres (1–0) || J. J. Hoover (1–1) ||  || Citi Field (25,424) || 2–3
|-  style="text-align:center; background:#ffbbbb"
| 6 || April 6 || Reds || 1–2 || Alfredo Simón (1–0) || Jon Niese (0–1) || Manny Parra (1) || Citi Field (26,928) || 2–4
|-  style="text-align:center; background:#bbffbb"
| 7 || April 8 || @Braves || 4–0 || Bartolo Colón (1–1) || Aaron Harang (1–1) ||  || Turner Field (47,144) || 3–4
|-  style="text-align:center; background:#ffbbbb"
| 8 || April 9 || @Braves || 3–4 || Ervin Santana (1–0) || Zack Wheeler (0–2) || Craig Kimbrel (4) || Turner Field (19,608)|| 3–5
|-  style="text-align:center; background:#bbffbb"
| 9 || April 10 || @Braves || 6–4 || Carlos Torres (2–0) || Luis Avilán (1–1) || José Valverde (2) || Turner Field (29,470) || 4–5
|-  style="text-align:center; background:#ffbbbb"
| 10 || April 11 || @Angels || 4–5 (11) || Michael Kohn (1–0) || Jeurys Familia (0–2) ||  || Angel Stadium (42,871) || 4–6
|-  style="text-align:center; background:#bbffbb"
| 11 || April 12 || @Angels || 7–6 (13) || John Lannan (1–0) || Matt Shoemaker (0–1) ||  || Angel Stadium (40,027) || 5–6
|-  style="text-align:center; background:#ffbbbb"
| 12 || April 13 || @Angels || 2–14 || C. J. Wilson (2–1) || Bartolo Colón (1–2) ||  || Angel Stadium (38,855) || 5–7
|-  style="text-align:center; background:#bbffbb"
| 13 || April 14 || @Diamondbacks || 7–3 || Zack Wheeler (1–2) || Josh Collmenter (0–1) || Carlos Torres (1) || Chase Field (18,099) || 6–7
|-  style="text-align:center; background:#bbffbb"
| 14 || April 15 || @Diamondbacks || 9–0 || Jenrry Mejía (2–0) || Bronson Arroyo (1–1) ||  || Chase Field (21,969) || 7–7
|-  style="text-align:center; background:#bbffbb"
| 15 || April 16 || @Diamondbacks || 5–2 || Dillon Gee (1–0) || Brandon McCarthy (0–3) ||  || Chase Field (19,673) || 8–7
|-  style="text-align:center; background:#ffbbbb"
| 16 || April 18 || Braves || 0–6 || Aaron Harang (3–1) || Jon Niese (0–2) ||  || Citi Field (33,199) || 8–8
|-  style="text-align:center; background:#ffbbbb"
| 17 || April 19 || Braves || 5–7 || Ervin Santana (2–0) || Bartolo Colón (1–3) || Jordan Walden (1) || Citi Field (31,476) || 8–9
|-  style="text-align:center; background:#bbffbb"
| 18 || April 20 || Braves || 4–3 (14) || José Valverde (1–0) || Gus Schlosser (0–1) ||  || Citi Field (33,131) || 9–9
|-  style="text-align:center; background:#bbffbb"
| 19 || April 21 || Cardinals || 2–0 || Jenrry Mejía (3–0) || Tyler Lyons (0–1) || Kyle Farnsworth (1) || Citi Field (20,382) || 10–9
|-  style="text-align:center; background:#ffbbbb"
| 20 || April 22 || Cardinals || 0–3 || Adam Wainwright (4–1) || Dillon Gee (1–1) || Trevor Rosenthal (6) || Citi Field (20,220) || 10–10
|-  style="text-align:center; background:#bbffbb"
| 21 || April 23 || Cardinals || 3–2 || Jon Niese (1–2) || Michael Wacha (2–2) || Kyle Farnsworth (2) || Citi Field (21,981) || 11–10
|-  style="text-align:center; background:#bbffbb"
| 22 || April 24 || Cardinals || 4–1 || Bartolo Colón (2–3) || Lance Lynn (4–1) || Daisuke Matsuzaka (1) || Citi Field (22,669) || 12–10
|-  style="text-align:center; background:#bbffbb"
| 23 || April 25 || Marlins || 4–3 || Jeurys Familia (1–2) || Steve Cishek (1–1) ||  || Citi Field (21,171) || 13–10
|-  style="text-align:center; background:#ffbbbb"
| 24 || April 26 || Marlins || 6–7 (10) || Mike Dunn (2–3) || Kyle Farnsworth (0–1) || Steve Cishek (5) || Citi Field (21,492) || 13–11
|-  style="text-align:center; background:#bbffbb"
| 25 || April 27 || Marlins || 4–0 || Dillon Gee (2–1) || Tom Koehler (2–2) ||  || Citi Field (26,861) || 14–11
|-  style="text-align:center; background:#bbffbb"
| 26 || April 29 || @Phillies || 6–1 || Jon Niese (2–2) || Cole Hamels (0–2) ||  || Citizens Bank Park (28,189) || 15–11
|-  style="text-align:center; background:#bbbbbb"
| || April 30 || @Phillies || colspan=4| Postponed (rain); rescheduled for June 2 || Citizens Bank Park ||
|-

|-  style="text-align:center; background:#ffbbbb"
| 27 || May 1 || @Rockies || 4–7 || Juan Nicasio (3–1) || Bartolo Colón (2–4) ||  || Coors Field (22,989) || 15–12
|-  style="text-align:center; background:#ffbbbb"
| 28 || May 2 || @Rockies || 3–10 || Jorge de la Rosa (3–3) || Zack Wheeler (1–3) ||  || Coors Field (42,040) || 15–13
|-  style="text-align:center; background:#ffbbbb"
| 29 || May 3 || @Rockies || 10–11 || LaTroy Hawkins (1–0) || Kyle Farnsworth (0–2) ||  || Coors Field (38,688) || 15–14
|-  style="text-align:center; background:#bbffbb"
| 30 || May 4 || @Rockies || 5–1 || Dillon Gee (3–1) || Jhoulys Chacín (0–1) ||  || Coors Field (40,190) || 16–14
|-  style="text-align:center; background:#ffbbbb"
| 31 || May 5 || @Marlins || 3–4 || Steve Cishek (2–1) || Gonzalez Germen (0–1) ||  || Marlins Park (20,606) || 16–15
|-  style="text-align:center; background:#ffbbbb"
| 32 || May 6 || @Marlins || 0–3 || Henderson Álvarez (2–2) || Bartolo Colón (2–5) ||  || Marlins Park (18,315) || 16–16
|-  style="text-align:center; background:#ffbbbb"
| 33 || May 7 || @Marlins || 0–1 || Steve Cishek (3–1) || Carlos Torres (2–1) ||  || Marlins Park (18,010) || 16–17
|-  style="text-align:center; background:#ffbbbb"
| 34 || May 9 || Phillies || 2–3 (11) || Mario Hollands (1–1) || Carlos Torres (2–2) || Jonathan Papelbon (10) || Citi Field (30,036) || 16–18
|-  style="text-align:center; background:#ffbbbb"
| 35 || May 10 || Phillies || 4–5 || Mike Adams (2–1) || Kyle Farnsworth (0–3) || Jonathan Papelbon (11) || Citi Field (29,170) || 16–19
|-  style="text-align:center; background:#bbffbb"
| 36 || May 11 || Phillies || 5–4 (11) || Scott Rice (1–1) || Jeff Manship (1–1) ||  || Citi Field (28,926) || 17–19
|-  style="text-align:center; background:#bbffbb"
| 37 || May 12 || @Yankees || 9–7 || Jenrry Mejía (4–0) || Matt Thornton (0–1) || Kyle Farnsworth (3) || Yankee Stadium (46,517) || 18–19 
|-  style="text-align:center; background:#bbffbb"
| 38 || May 13 || @Yankees || 12–7 || Daisuke Matsuzaka (1–0) || Vidal Nuño (1–1) ||  || Yankee Stadium (45,958) || 19–19
|-  style="text-align:center; background:#ffbbbb" 
| 39 || May 14 || Yankees || 0–4 || Masahiro Tanaka (6–0) || Rafael Montero (0–1) ||  || Citi Field (35,557) || 19–20
|-  style="text-align:center; background:#ffbbbb"
| 40 || May 15 || Yankees || 0–1 || Dellin Betances (2–0) || Jacob deGrom (0–1) || David Robertson (7) || Citi Field (40,133) || 19–21
|-  style="text-align:center; background:#ffbbbb"
| 41 || May 16 || @Nationals || 2–5 || Tanner Roark (3–1) || Jon Niese (2–3) || Rafael Soriano (9) || Nationals Park (34,413) || 19–22
|-  style="text-align:center; background:#bbffbb"
| 42 || May 17 || @Nationals || 5–2 || Bartolo Colón (3–5) || Gio González (3–4) || Jenrry Mejía (1) || Nationals Park (41,225) || 20–22
|-  style="text-align:center; background:#ffbbbb"
| 43 || May 18 || @Nationals || 3–6 || Jordan Zimmermann (3–1) || Zack Wheeler (1–4) || Rafael Soriano (10) || Nationals Park (36,965) || 20–23
|-  style="text-align:center; background:#ffbbbb"
| 44 || May 20 || Dodgers || 4–9 || Josh Beckett (2–1) || Rafael Montero (0–2) ||  || Citi Field (22,288) || 20–24
|-  style="text-align:center; background:#ffbbbb"
| 45 || May 21 || Dodgers || 3–4 || Hyun-jin Ryu (4–2) || Jacob deGrom (0–2) || Kenley Jansen (13) || Citi Field (23,721) || 20–25
|-  style="text-align:center; background:#bbffbb"
| 46 || May 22 || Dodgers || 5–3 || Jon Niese (3–3) || Chris Perez (0–2) || Jenrry Mejía (2) || Citi Field (23,416) || 21–25
|-  style="text-align:center; background:#bbbbbb"
| || May 23 || Diamondbacks || colspan=4|Postponed (rain); rescheduled for May 25 || Citi Field ||
|-  style="text-align:center; background:#ffbbbb"
| 47 || May 24 || Diamondbacks || 2–3 || Josh Collmenter (3–2) || Zack Wheeler (1–5) || Addison Reed (13) || Citi Field (24,551) || 21–26
|-  style="text-align:center; background:#ffbbbb"
| 48 || May 25 || Diamondbacks || 1–2 || Evan Marshall (2–0) || Jenrry Mejía (4–1) || Addison Reed (14) || Citi Field (30,785) || 21–27
|-  style="text-align:center; background:#bbffbb"
| 49 || May 25 || Diamondbacks || 4–2 || Daisuke Matsuzaka (2–0) || Zeke Spruill (0–1) || Jenrry Mejía (3) || Citi Field (30,785) || 22–27
|-  style="text-align:center; background:#ffbbbb"
| 50 || May 26 || Pirates || 3–5 || Tony Watson (5–0) || José Valverde (1–1) || Mark Melancon (10) || Citi Field (29,309) || 22–28
|-  style="text-align:center; background:#bbffbb"
| 51 || May 27 || Pirates || 4–2 || Vic Black (1–0) || Jeanmar Gómez (0–2) || Jenrry Mejía (4) || Citi Field (20,263) || 23–28
|-  style="text-align:center; background:#bbffbb"
| 52 || May 28 || Pirates || 5–0 || Bartolo Colón (4–5) || Charlie Morton (1–7) || Jeurys Familia (1) || Citi Field (34,839) || 24–28
|-  style="text-align:center; background:#bbffbb"
| 53 || May 29 || @Phillies || 4–1 || Zack Wheeler (2–5) || David Buchanan (1–1) || Jenrry Mejía (5) || Citizens Bank Park (26,668) || 25–28
|-  style="text-align:center; background:#ffbbbb"
| 54 || May 30 || @Phillies || 5–6 (14)  || Justin De Fratus (1–0) || Jenrry Mejía (4–2) ||  || Citizens Bank Park (30,236) || 25–29
|-  style="text-align:center; background:#bbffbb"
| 55 || May 31 || @Phillies || 5–4 (14) || Buddy Carlyle (1–0) || Antonio Bastardo (3–3) || Carlos Torres (2) || Citizens Bank Park (37,516) || 26–29
|-

|-  style="text-align:center; background:#bbffbb"
| 56 || June 1 || @Phillies || 4–3 (11) || Josh Edgin (1–0) || Phillippe Aumont (0–1) || Jenrry Mejía (6) || Citizens Bank Park (36,039) || 27–29 
|-  style="text-align:center; background:#bbffbb"
| 57 || June 2 || @Phillies || 11–2 || Bartolo Colón (5–5) || Roberto Hernández (2–3) ||  || Citizens Bank Park (26,302) || 28–29
|-  style="text-align:center; background:#ffbbbb"
| 58 || June 3 || @Cubs || 1–2 || Héctor Rondón (1–1) || Scott Rice (1–2) ||  || Wrigley Field (34,697) || 28–30
|-  style="text-align:center; background:#ffbbbb"
| 59 || June 4 || @Cubs || 4–5 || Edwin Jackson (4–5) || Dana Eveland (0–1) || Héctor Rondón (7) || Wrigley Field (28,185) || 28–31
|-  style="text-align:center; background:#ffbbbb"
| 60 || June 5 || @Cubs || 4–7 || Justin Grimm (2–2) || Vic Black (1–1) || Neil Ramirez (1) || Wrigley Field (28,833) || 28–32
|-  style="text-align:center; background:#ffbbbb"
| 61 || June 6 || @Giants || 2–4 || Jeremy Affeldt (1–1) || Carlos Torres (2–3) || Sergio Romo (19) || AT&T Park (41,437) || 28–33
|-  style="text-align:center; background:#ffbbbb"
| 62 || June 7 || @Giants || 4–5 || Jeremy Affeldt (2–1) || Jenrry Mejía (4–3) ||  || AT&T Park (41,296) || 28–34
|-  style="text-align:center; background:#ffbbbb"
| 63 || June 8 || @Giants || 4–6 || Tim Lincecum (5–4) || Zack Wheeler (2–6) || Sergio Romo (20) || AT&T Park (41,911) || 28–35
|-  style="text-align:center; background:#bbffbb"
| 64 || June 10 || Brewers || 6–2 || Daisuke Matsuzaka (3–0) || Marco Estrada (5–3) ||  || Citi Field (20,206) || 29–35
|-  style="text-align:center; background:#ffbbbb"
| 65 || June 11 || Brewers || 1–3 || Wily Peralta (6–5) || Jacob deGrom (0–3) || Francisco Rodríguez (20) || Citi Field (20,170) || 29–36
|-  style="text-align:center; background:#ffbbbb"
| 66 || June 12 || Brewers || 1–5 || Zach Duke (4–0) || Carlos Torres (2–4) ||  || Citi Field (22,155) || 29–37
|-  style="text-align:center; background:#bbffbb"
| 67 || June 13 || Padres || 6–2 || Bartolo Colón (6–5) || Andrew Cashner (2–6) ||  || Citi Field (28,085) || 30–37  
|-  style="text-align:center; background:#ffbbbb"
| 68 || June 14 || Padres || 0–5 || Jesse Hahn (1–1) || Zack Wheeler (2–7) ||  || Citi Field (38,269) || 30–38 
|-  style="text-align:center; background:#bbffbb"
| 69 || June 15 || Padres || 3–1 || Carlos Torres (3–4) || Ian Kennedy (5–8) || Jenrry Mejía (7) || Citi Field (38,987) || 31–38 
|-  style="text-align:center; background:#ffbbbb"
| 70 || June 16 || @Cardinals || 2–6 || Nick Greenwood (1–0) || Jacob deGrom (0–4) || Seth Maness (1) || Busch Stadium (42,808) || 31–39  
|-  style="text-align:center; background:#ffbbbb"
| 71 || June 17 || @Cardinals || 2–5 || Michael Wacha (5–5) || Jon Niese (3–4) || Pat Neshek (2) || Busch Stadium (42,209) || 31–40 
|-  style="text-align:center; background:#bbffbb"
| 72 || June 18 || @Cardinals || 3–2 || Bartolo Colón (7–5) || Lance Lynn (7–5) || Dana Eveland (1) || Busch Stadium (42,221) || 32–40  
|-  style="text-align:center; background:#bfb"
| 73 || June 19 || @Marlins || 1–0 || Zack Wheeler (3–7) || Andrew Heaney (0–1) ||  || Marlins Park (20,334) || 33–40
|-  style="text-align:center; background:#fbb"
| 74 || June 20 || @Marlins || 2–3 || Henderson Álvarez (4–3) || Daisuke Matsuzaka (3–1) || Steve Cishek (17) || Marlins Park (19,725) || 33–41
|-  style="text-align:center; background:#bfb"
| 75 || June 21 || @Marlins || 4–0 || Jacob deGrom (1–4) || Tom Koehler (5–6) ||  || Marlins Park (24,502) || 34–41
|-  style="text-align:center; background:#bfb"
| 76 || June 22 || @Marlins || 11–5 || Jon Niese (4–4) || Anthony DeSclafani (1–2) ||  || Marlins Park (24,613) || 35–41
|-  style="text-align:center; background:#bfb"
| 77 || June 24 || Athletics || 10–1 || Bartolo Colón (8–5) || Scott Kazmir (9–3) ||  || Citi Field (25,751) || 36–41  
|-  style="text-align:center; background:#fbb"
| 78 || June 25 || Athletics || 5–8 || Brad Mills (1–0) || Zack Wheeler (3–8) || Sean Doolittle (11) || Citi Field (23,367) || 36–42 
|-  style="text-align:center; background:#fbb"
| 79 || June 26 || @Pirates || 2–5 || Vance Worley (2–0) || Daisuke Matsuzaka (3–2) || Mark Melancon (14) || PNC Park (36,647) || 36–43  
|-  style="text-align:center; background:#fbb"
| 80 || June 27 || @Pirates || 2–3 || Jared Hughes (4–2) || Vic Black (1–2) ||  || PNC Park (37,952) || 36–44 
|-  style="text-align:center; background:#bfb"
| 81 || June 28 || @Pirates || 5–3 || Jon Niese (5–4) || Gerrit Cole (6–4) || Jenrry Mejía (8) || PNC Park (38,930) || 37–44 
|-  style="text-align:center; background:#fbb"
| 82 || June 29 || @Pirates || 2–5 || Edinson Vólquez (6–6) || Bartolo Colón (8–6) || Mark Melancon (15) || PNC Park (37,290) || 37–45 
|-  style="text-align:center; background:#fbb"
| 83 || June 30 || @Braves || 3–5 || Anthony Varvaro (3–1) || Jeurys Familia (1–3) || Craig Kimbrel (25) || Turner Field (28,075) || 37–46 
|-

|-  style="text-align:center; background:#fbb"
| 84 || July 1 || @Braves || 4–5 || Shae Simmons (1–0) || Daisuke Matsuzaka (3–3) || Craig Kimbrel (26) || Turner Field (21,347) || 37–47
|-  style="text-align:center; background:#fbb"
| 85 || July 2 || @Braves || 1–3 || Julio Teherán (8–5) ||  Jacob deGrom (1–5) || Jordan Walden (3) || Turner Field (23,601) || 37–48  
|-  style="text-align:center; background:#bfb"
| 86 || July 4 || Rangers || 6–5 ||  Jenrry Mejía (5–3) || Aaron Poreda (2–1) ||  || Citi Field (30,377) || 38–48  
|-  style="text-align:center; background:#fbb"
| 87 || July 5 || Rangers || 3–5 || Colby Lewis (6–5) || Bartolo Colón (8–7) || Joakim Soria (16) || Citi Field (24,418) || 38–49  
|-  style="text-align:center; background:#bfb"
| 88 || July 6 || Rangers || 8–4 || Zack Wheeler (4–8) || Nick Tepesch (3–4) ||  || Citi Field (25,213) || 39–49
|-  style="text-align:center; background:#bfb"
| 89 || July 7 || Braves || 4–3 ||  Carlos Torres (4–4) || Anthony Varvaro (3–2) ||  || Citi Field (20,836) || 40–49  
|-  style="text-align:center; background:#bfb"
| 90 || July 8 || Braves || 8–3 || Jacob deGrom (2–5)  || Juio Teheran (8–6) ||  || Citi Field (20,671) || 41–49  
|-  style="text-align:center; background:#bfb"
| 91 || July 9 || Braves || 4–1 || Dillon Gee (4–1) || Ervin Santana (7–6) || Jenrry Mejía (9) || Citi Field (21,327) || 42–49 
|-  style="text-align:center; background:#fbb"
| 92 || July 10 || Braves || 1–3 || Aaron Harang (9–6) || Bartolo Colón (8–8) || Craig Kimbrel (28) || Citi Field (23,528) || 42–50
|-  style="text-align:center; background:#bfb"
| 93 || July 11 || Marlins || 7–1 || Zack Wheeler (5–8) || Henderson Álvarez (6–4) ||  || Citi Field (25,914) || 43–50
|-  style="text-align:center; background:#bfb"
| 94 || July 12 || Marlins || 5–4 || Vic Black (2–2) || Mike Dunn (7–5) || Jenrry Mejía (10) || Citi Field (35,283) || 44–50
|-  style="text-align:center; background:#bfb"
| 95 || July 13 || Marlins || 9–1 || Jacob deGrom (3–5) || Brad Hand (0–2) ||  || Citi Field (28,187) || 45–50
|-  style="text-align:center; background:#bbbbbb"
|  || July 15 || N.L. @ A.L. || AL 5–3 NL || colspan=3| 2014 Major League Baseball All-Star Game || Target Field (41,048) ||
|-  style="text-align:center; background:#bfb"
| 96 || July 18 || @Padres || 5–4 || Jeurys Familia (2–3) || Joaquín Benoit (3–2) || Jenrry Mejía (11) || Petco Park (27,374) || 46–50
|-  style="text-align:center; background:#fbb"
| 97 || July 19 || @Padres || 0–6 || Tyson Ross (8–10) || Dillon Gee (4–2) ||  || Petco Park (42,702) || 46–51
|-  style="text-align:center; background:#fbb"
| 98 || July 20 || @Padres || 1–2 || Joaquín Benoit (4–2) || Vic Black (2–3) ||  || Petco Park (31,513) || 46–52
|-  style="text-align:center; background:#fbb"
| 99 || July 21 || @Mariners || 2–5 || Roenis Elias (8–8) || Jon Niese (5–5) ||  || Safeco Field (21,943) || 46–53
|-  style="text-align:center; background:#bfb"
| 100 || July 22 || @Mariners || 3–1 || Jacob deGrom (4–5) || Erasmo Ramírez (1–5) || Jenrry Mejía (12) || Safeco Field (18,681) || 47–53
|-  style="text-align:center; background:#bfb"
| 101 || July 23 || @Mariners || 3–2 || Bartolo Colón (9–8) || Taijuan Walker (1–2) || Jenrry Mejía (13) || Safeco Field (36,224) || 48–53
|-  style="text-align:center; background:#fbb"
| 102 || July 24 || @Brewers || 1–9 || Matt Garza (7–7) || Dillon Gee (4–3) ||  || Miller Park (29,755) || 48–54
|-  style="text-align:center; background:#bfb"
| 103 || July 25 || @Brewers || 3–2 || Carlos Torres (5–4) || Francisco Rodríguez (4–4) || Jenrry Mejía (14) || Miller Park (33,097) || 49–54
|-  style="text-align:center; background:#fbb"
| 104 || July 26 || @Brewers || 2–5 || Wily Peralta (12–6) || Jon Niese (5–6) || Francisco Rodríguez (30) || Miller Park (39,292)|| 49–55
|-  style="text-align:center; background:#bfb"
| 105 || July 27 || @Brewers || 2–0 || Jacob deGrom (5–5) || Jimmy Nelson (1–2) || Jenrry Mejía (15) || Miller Park (39,040) || 50–55
|-  style="text-align:center; background:#bfb"
| 106 || July 28 || Phillies || 7–1 || Bartolo Colón (10–8) || A. J. Burnett (6–10) ||  || Citi Field (26,525) || 51–55
|-  style="text-align:center; background:#fbb"
| 107 || July 29 || Phillies || 0–6 || Cole Hamels (6–5) || Dillon Gee (4–4) ||  || Citi Field (27,069) || 51–56
|-  style="text-align:center; background:#bfb"
| 108 || July 30 || Phillies || 11–2 || Zack Wheeler (6–8) || Kyle Kendrick (5–11) ||  || Citi Field (37,647) || 52–56
|-

|-  style="text-align:center; background:#fbb"
| 109 || August 1 || Giants || 1–5 || Ryan Vogelsong (6–8) || Jon Niese (5–7) ||  || Citi Field (28,905) || 52–57
|-  style="text-align:center; background:#bfb"
| 110 || August 2 || Giants || 4–2 || Jacob deGrom (6–5) || Jake Peavy (1–11) || Jenrry Mejía (16) || Citi Field (33,687) || 53–57
|-  style="text-align:center; background:#fbb"
| 111 || August 3 || Giants || 0–9 || Madison Bumgarner (13–8) || Bartolo Colón (10–9) ||  || Citi Field (32,408) || 53–58
|-  style="text-align:center; background:#fbb"
| 112 || August 4 || Giants || 3–4 || Sergio Romo (5–3) || Jenrry Mejía (5–4) || Santiago Casilla (9) || Citi Field (27,187) || 53–59
|-  style="text-align:center; background:#bfb"
| 113 || August 5 || @Nationals || 6–1 || Zack Wheeler (7–8) || Gio González (6–8) ||  || Nationals Park (40,686) || 54–59
|-  style="text-align:center; background:#fbb"
| 114 || August 6 || @Nationals || 1–7 || Doug Fister (11–3) || Jon Niese (5–8) ||  || Nationals Park (26,701) || 54–60
|-  style="text-align:center; background:#fbb"
| 115 || August 7 || @Nationals || 3–5 (13) || Craig Stammen (2–4) || Carlos Torres (5–5) ||  || Nationals Park (38,611) || 54–61
|-  style="text-align:center; background:#bfb"
| 116 || August 8 || @Phillies || 5–4 || Bartolo Colón (11–9) || A. J. Burnett (6–12) || Jenrry Mejía (17) || Citizens Bank Park (32,307) || 55–61
|-  style="text-align:center; background:#bfb"
| 117 || August 9 || @Phillies || 2–1 (11) || Dana Eveland (1–1) || Antonio Bastardo (5–5) || Jeurys Familia (2) || Citizens Bank Park (39,153) || 56–61
|-  style="text-align:center; background:#fbb"
| 118 || August 10 || @Phillies || 6–7 || Ken Giles (1–0) || Jenrry Mejía (5–5) ||  || Citizens Bank Park (31,061) || 56–62
|-  style="text-align:center; background:#bfb"
| 119 || August 11 || @Phillies || 5–3 || Jon Niese (6–8) || David Buchanan (6–6) ||  Jeurys Familia (3) || Citizens Bank Park (26,076) || 57–62
|-  style="text-align:center; background:#fbb"
| 120 || August 12 || Nationals || 1–7  || Doug Fister (12–3) || Rafael Montero (0-3)  || || Citi Field (21,200) || 57-63
|-  style="text-align:center; background:#fbb"
| 121 || August 13 || Nationals || 2–3  || Jordan Zimmermann (8–5) || Bartolo Colón (11-10)  || Rafael Soriano (27) ||Citi Field (21,364) || 57-64
|-  style="text-align:center; background:#fbb"
| 122 || August 14 || Nationals || 1–4  || Stephen Strasburg (9–10) || Dillon Gee (4-5)  || Rafael Soriano (28) || Citi Field (22,782) || 57-65
|-  style="text-align:center; background:#bfb"
| 123 || August 15 || Cubs || 3–2 || Zack Wheeler (8–8) || Travis Wood (7–10) || Jenrry Mejía (18) || Citi Field (25,016) || 58–65
|-  style="text-align:center; background:#bfb"
| 124 || August 16 || Cubs || 7–3 || Jon Niese (7–8) || Dan Straily (1–3) ||  || Citi Field (30,744) || 59–65
|-  style="text-align:center; background:#fbb"
| 125 || August 17 || Cubs || 1–2 || Pedro Strop (2–4) || Jenrry Mejía (5–6) || Hector Rondon (17) || Citi Field (27,938) || 59–66
|-  style="text-align:center; background:#fbb"
| 126 || August 18 || Cubs || 1–4 || Kyle Hendricks (5–1) || Buddy Carlyle (1–1) || Hector Rondon (18) || Citi Field || 59–67
|-  style="text-align:center; background:#fbb"
| 127 || August 19 || @Athletics || 2–6 || Scott Kazmir (14–5) || Dillon Gee (4–6) ||  || O.co Coliseum (23,498) || 59–68
|-  style="text-align:center; background:#bfb"
| 128 || August 20 || @Athletics || 8–5 || Zack Wheeler (9–8) || Jeff Samardzija (5–10) || Jeurys Familia (4) || O.co Coliseum (20,312) || 60–68
|-  style="text-align:center; background:#fbb"
| 129 || August 22 || @Dodgers || 2–6 || Dan Haren (11–10) || Jon Niese (7–9) ||  || Dodger Stadium (44,374) || 60–69
|-  style="text-align:center; background:#fbb"
| 130 || August 23 || @Dodgers || 4–7 || Zack Greinke (13–8) || Jacob deGrom (6–6) || Kenley Jansen (37) || Dodger Stadium (51,215) || 60–70
|-  style="text-align:center; background:#bfb"
| 131 || August 24 || @Dodgers || 11–3 || Bartolo Colón (12–10) || Kevin Correia (7–14) ||  || Dodger Stadium (47,290) || 61–70
|-  style="text-align:center; background:#bfb"
| 132 || August 26 || Braves || 3–2 || Dillon Gee (5–6) || Alex Wood (9–10) || Jenrry Mejía (19) || Citi Field (22,406) || 62–70
|-  style="text-align:center; background:#fbb"
| 133 || August 27 || Braves || 2–3 || Julio Teherán (13–9) || Zack Wheeler (9–9) || Craig Kimbrel (39) || Citi Field (22,014) || 62–71
|-  style="text-align:center; background:#fbb"
| 134 || August 28 || Braves || 1–6 || Mike Minor (6–8) || Jon Niese (7–10) ||  || Citi Field (22,154) || 62–72
|-  style="text-align:center; background:#bfb"
| 135 || August 29 || Phillies || 4–1 || Jacob deGrom (7–6) || Jake Diekman (3–4) || Jenrry Mejía (20) || Citi Field (25,250) || 63–72
|-  style="text-align:center; background:#fbb"
| 136 || August 30 || Phillies || 2–7 || Jerome Williams (5–5) || Bartolo Colón (12–11) ||  || Citi Field (28,053) || 63–73
|-  style="text-align:center; background:#bfb"
| 137 || August 31 || Phillies || 6–5 || Dillon Gee (6–6) || A. J. Burnett (7–15) || Jenrry Mejía (21) || Citi Field (27,159) || 64–73
|-

|-  style="text-align:center; background:#fbb"
| 138 || September 1 || @Marlins || 6–9 || A. J. Ramos (6–0) || Jeurys Familia (2–4) || Steve Cishek (32) || Marlins Park (23,090) || 64–74
|-  style="text-align:center; background:#bfb"
| 139 || September 2 || @Marlins || 8–6 || Jon Niese (8–10) || Brad Penny (1–1) || Jenrry Mejía (22) || Marlins Park (17,745) || 65–74
|-  style="text-align:center; background:#bfb"
| 140 || September 3 || @Marlins || 4–3 || Carlos Torres (6–5) || Mike Dunn (10–6) || Jenrry Mejía (23) || Marlins Park (17,737) || 66–74
|-  style="text-align:center; background:#bfb"
| 141 || September 5 || @Reds || 14–5 || Bartolo Colón (13–11) || Alfredo Simón (13–10) ||  || Great American Ball Park (29,089) || 67–74
|-  style="text-align:center; background:#fbb"
| 142 || September 6 || @Reds || 1–2 || Johnny Cueto (17–8) || Dillon Gee (6–7) || Aroldis Chapman (30) || Great American Ball Park (33,762) || 67–75
|-  style="text-align:center; background:#bfb"
| 143 || September 7 || @Reds || 4–3 || Zack Wheeler (10–9) || Mat Latos (5–5) || Jenrry Mejía (24) || Great American Ball Park (31,444) || 68–75
|-  style="text-align:center; background:#bfb"
| 144 || September 8 || Rockies || 3–2 || Carlos Torres (7–5) || LaTroy Hawkins (3–3) ||  || Citi Field (21,710) || 69–75
|-  style="text-align:center; background:#bfb"
| 145 || September 9 || Rockies || 2–0 || Jacob deGrom (8–6) || Christian Bergman (2–3) || Jeurys Familia (5) || Citi Field (21,035) || 70–75
|-  style="text-align:center; background:#bfb"
| 146 || September 10 || Rockies || 2–0 || Rafael Montero (1–3) || Matzek (5–10) || Jenrry Mejía (25) || Citi Field (21,260) || 71–75
|-  style="text-align:center; background:#fbb"
| 147 || September 11 || Nationals || 2–6 ||  Tanner Roark (13–10) || Bartolo Colón (13-12) || || Citi Field (21,111) || 71–76
|-  style="text-align:center; background:#bfb"
| 148 || September 12 || Nationals || 4–3 ||  Dillon Gee (7–7) || Gio González (8-10) || Jenrry Mejía (26) || Citi Field (25,792) || 72–76
|-  style="text-align:center; background:#fbb"
| 149 || September 13 || Nationals || 3–10 ||  Doug Fister (14–6) || Zack Wheeler (10-10) || || Citi Field (28,849) || 72–77
|-  style="text-align:center; background:#fbb"
| 150 || September 14 || Nationals || 0–3 ||  Jordan Zimmermann (12–5) || Jonathon Niese (8-11) || Drew Storen (5)  || Citi Field (31,553) || 72–78
|-  style="text-align:center; background:#fbb"
| 151 || September 15 || Marlins || 5–6 || Sam Dyson (3–1) || Jeurys Familia (2–5) || Steve Cishek (36) || Citi Field (23,027) || 72–79
|-  style="text-align:center; background:#bfb"
| 152 || September 16 || Marlins || 9–1 ||Bartolo Colón (14–12) || Nathan Eovaldi (6–12) ||  || Citi Field (21,602) || 73–79
|-  style="text-align:center; background:#fbb"
| 153 || September 17 || Marlins || 3–4 || Henderson Álvarez (11–6) || Dillon Gee (7–8) || Steve Cishek (37) || Citi Field (23,892) || 73–80
|-  style="text-align:center; background:#bfb"
| 154 || September 19 || @Braves || 5–0 || Zack Wheeler (11–10) || Julio Teherán (13–13) ||  || Turner Field (35,693) || 74–80
|-  style="text-align:center; background:#bfb"
| 155 || September 20 || @Braves || 4–2 || Jon Niese (9–11) || Mike Minor (6–12) || Jenrry Mejía (27) || Turner Field (33,794) || 75–80
|-  style="text-align:center; background:#bfb"
| 156 || September 21 || @Braves || 10–2 || Jacob deGrom (9–6) || Ervin Santana (14–10) ||  || Turner Field (35,354) || 76–80
|-  style="text-align:center; background:#fbb"
| 157 || September 23 || @Nationals || 2–4 ||  Tanner Roark (15–10) || Bartolo Colón (14–13) || Drew Storen (10) || Nationals Park (30,714) || 76–81
|-align="center" bgcolor="bbbbbb"
|–|| September 24 || @Nationals || colspan=6| Postponed (rain) Rescheduled for September 25
|-  style="text-align:center; background:#bfb"
| 158 || September 25 || @Nationals || 7–4 ||  Carlos Torres (8–5) || Tyler Clippard (7-4) || Jenrry Mejía (28) || Nationals Park (28,629) || 77–81
|-  style="text-align:center; background:#fbb"
| 159 || September 25 || @Nationals || 3–0 ||  Gio González (10–10) || Zack Wheeler (11–11) || Drew Storen (11) || Nationals Park (26,439) || 77–82
|-  style="text-align:center; background:#fbb"
| 160 || September 26 || Astros || 3-1 || Kevin Chapman (2-0) || Carlos Torres (8-6) || Chad Qualls (19)  || Citi Field (27,729) || 77-83
|-  style="text-align:center; background:#bfb"
| 161 || September 27 || Astros || 2-1 || Jenrry Mejía (6-6) || Tony Sipp (4-3) ||  || Citi Field (34,886) || 78-83
|-  style="text-align:center; background:#bfb"
| 162 || September 28 || Astros || 8-3  || Bartolo Colón (15-13) || Nick Tropeano (1-3) ||  || Citi Field (34,897) || 79-83
|-

Roster

Player stats

Batting
Players bolded are presently on Mets active roster.
Note: G = Games played; AB = At bats; R = Runs scored; H = Hits; 2B = Doubles; 3B = Triples; HR = Home runs; RBI = Runs batted in; SB = Stolen bases; BB = Base on balls; K = Strikeouts; AVG = Batting average

Pitching
Players bolded' are currently on the Mets active roster.  Note: G = Games pitched; GS = Games started; W = Wins; L = Losses; SV = Saves; IP = Innings pitched; H = Hits; R = Runs; ER = Earned runs allowed; BB = Walks allowed; K = Strikeouts; ERA = Earned run average; Farm system

LEAGUE CHAMPIONS: Binghamton

References

External links

2014 New York Mets season Official Site
2014 New York Mets season at Baseball Reference''
2014 New York Mets season at ESPN

New York Mets seasons
New York Mets season
New York Mets
2010s in Queens
Flushing, Queens